Luciano Sánchez García (28 May 1944), known as Vavá II, is a retired Spanish footballer who played as a forward.

Club career
As a youngster, Luciano gave himself the nickname Vavá II, due to his admiration for the Brazilian striker, he began his career with his hometown team, CD Béjar Industrial. In 1963 he signed for Elche CF, although the first season he played for the reserve team, Deportivo Ilicitano, in Segunda División.

He made his debut on Primera División on 18 October 1964, in a match against UD Las Palmas in which he scored a goal. In 1965, he played a friendly match for FC Barcelona. The following year, the 1965/66 season, he was the top scorer in the Spanish League, with nineteen goals, making him the only player in the history of Elche CF to have won the Pichichi Trophy. A few months later, he also became the first Elche player to wear the Spain national team shirt. In 1969 he was runner-up in the Copa del Rey, the greatest sporting success in the history of Elche CF. In the final, Athletic Bilbao won 1-0 and Vavá played the entire match.

Despite losing the category in the 1970/71 season, he continued to play for Elche in Segunda División. For the 1973/74 season he signed for Deportivo de La Coruña, where he played for one season. In 1974 he retired from professional football, and he played for Melilla CF, Mérida Industrial and Don Benito for the following seasons until 1979, when he ultimately retired.

International career
In the Spain national team, he played two matches without scoring a goal. He made his debut on 23 October 1966 in a match against the Republic of Ireland.

Career statistics

Clubs
Source:

International

Honours

Individual
La Liga: Top Scorer 1965–66

References

External links

1944 births
Living people
People from Béjar
Sportspeople from the Province of Salamanca
Spanish footballers
Footballers from Castile and León
Association football forwards
La Liga players
Segunda División players
Tercera División players
Elche CF Ilicitano footballers
CD Don Benito players
Elche CF players
Deportivo de La Coruña players
Spain international footballers
Pichichi Trophy winners